Flat Shoal Creek is a  long 3rd order tributary to the Ararat River in Surry County, North Carolina.

Course
Flat Shoal Creek rises on the Stoney Creek divide (south side of Chestnut Ridge) about 4 miles southeast of Sheltontown, North Carolina.  Flat Shoal Creek then flows south before turning southwest to join the Ararat River at Ararat, North Carolina.

Watershed
Flat Shoal Creek drains  of area, receives about 47.9 in/year of precipitation, has a wetness index of 341.81, and is about 53% forested.

See also
List of rivers of North Carolina

References

Rivers of North Carolina
Rivers of Surry County, North Carolina